William II of Bures (died 1158) was a Crusader lord of the Kingdom of Jerusalem. He was Prince of Galilee from 1148 to his death as successor of his brother Elinand. In late 1157, William was sent with Humphrey of Toron and Joscelin Pisellus, a knight, by Baldwin III in a delegation to Emperor Manuel in Constantinople to arrange Baldwin's marriage.

William is a poorly known figure. It is known that he was a nephew of William I of Bures and as this William is only known to have one brother, Godfrey, it is presumed that William and his three known brothers and one sister were children of his.

William was succeeded in Galilee by his sister Eschiva.

References 

1158 deaths
Princes of Galilee
Christians of the Crusades
Year of birth unknown